This article lists events from the year 2019 in the Bahamas

Incumbents
Monarch: Elizabeth II
 Governor-General: Marguerite Pindling (until June 28), Cornelius A. Smith (from June 28)
 Prime Minister: Hubert Minnis

Events

 Hurricane Dorian

Deaths
21 January – Ervin Knowles, former cabinet minister (b. 1934).

See also
 List of years in the Bahamas
 Effects of Hurricane Dorian in The Bahamas

References

Links
 

 
2010s in the Bahamas
Years of the 21st century in the Bahamas
Bahamas
Bahamas